The 1981 Edmonton Eskimos finished in 1st place in the West Division with a 14–1–1 record and won their fourth consecutive Grey Cup championship after winning the 69th Grey Cup.

Pre-season

Schedule

Regular season

Season Standings

Season schedule

Total attendance: 357,103  
Average attendance: 44,638 (103.0%)

Playoffs

Grey Cup

Awards and honours
CFL's Most Outstanding Defensive Player Award – Danny Kepley (LB)
Dick Suderman Trophy – Neil Lumsden
Norm Fieldgate Trophy – Danny Kepley

References

Edmonton Elks seasons
Grey Cup championship seasons
N. J. Taylor Trophy championship seasons